Andreaw Rayan Andy Gravillon (born 8 February 1998) is a Guadeloupean Malagasy professional footballer who plays as a defender for Italian  club Torino on loan from Reims, and the Guadeloupe national team.

Club career

Inter Milan
On 14 May 2017, Gravillon received his first call-up for the first team from Stefano Vecchi in a match against Sassuolo, but he was an unused substitute of a 2–1 home defeat. On 27 May, he received his second call-up, but, again, he stayed on the bench, in a 5–2 home win over Udinese.

Benevento
On 1 July 2017, Gravillon signed for the newly promoted Serie A team Benevento on a four-year contract while Internazionale was paid a €1.5 million fee. On 24 September, he made his Serie A debut for Benevento in a game against Crotone in a 2–0 away defeat, he was replaced by Gaetano Letizia in the 63rd minute.

Return to Inter Milan
On 29 January 2019, Gravillon joined to Internazionale, he stayed at Pescara on loan for the remainder of the 2018–19 season. On 17 July 2019, Gravillon moved to Sassuolo on loan with an option of permanent deal. On 2 September 2019, he was sent on a different loan, to Serie B club Ascoli. On 25 September 2020, he joined Ligue 1 club FC Lorient on loan with an option to buy.

Reims
On 13 July 2021, he joined Reims on loan for the 2021–22 season.

On 22 December 2021, Gravillon made his 17th league appearance with the club in a 1–1 draw against Marseille, triggering the obligation to buy clause and signing a permanent contract with Reims until June 2025, as confirmed by the chairman of the club Jean-Pierre Caillot on 26 December 2021.

Loan to Torino
On 31 January 2023, Gravillon returned to Italy and joined Torino on loan with an option to buy.

International career
In June 2021 he was called up for Guadeloupe national football team preliminary roster for the 2021 CONCACAF Gold Cup qualification. He debuted almost one year later (on 2 June 2022) in a 2–1 win match against Cuba valid for the 2022–23 CONCACAF Nations League.

Career statistics

References

External links
 

1998 births
Living people
People from Pointe-à-Pitre
Guadeloupean footballers
Association football defenders
Guadeloupe international footballers
Ligue 1 players
Serie A players
Serie B players
Benevento Calcio players
Inter Milan players
Delfino Pescara 1936 players
U.S. Sassuolo Calcio players
Ascoli Calcio 1898 F.C. players
FC Lorient players
Stade de Reims players
Torino F.C. players
Guadeloupean expatriate footballers
Guadeloupean expatriate sportspeople in Italy
Expatriate footballers in Italy